The Communion Girl is a 2022 Spanish horror film directed by Víctor Garcia from a screenplay by Guillem Clua based on an original story by Garcia and Alberto Marini. It stars Carla Campra, Aina Quiñones, Marc Soler, and Carlos Oviedo.

Plot 
In May 1987, friends Sara and Rebe are in their way back home from a night out with recreational drugs following the first communion of Sara's younger sister Judith. They find a doll on the road.

Cast

Production 
The film is Víctor Garcia's Spanish-language debut feature after a career primarily developed in American B movies. The screenplay was penned by Guillem Clua, based on an original story by Alberto Marini and Garcia. The film is an Ikiru Films, La Terraza Films, La Niña de la Comunión AIE, and Atresmedia Cine production. Shooting locations included Corbera d'Ebre.

Release 
The film was presented at the 55th Sitges Film Festival on 14 October 2022. Distributed by Warner Bros., the film was theatrically released in Spain on 10 February 2023. It grossed €413,363 (59,004 admissions) at the Spanish box office in its opening weekend.

Reception 
Juan Pando of Fotogramas rated The Communion Girl 4 out of 5 stars, considering it to be one of those films in which the lack of ambition is their best virtue, praising the "authentic" characters.

Sergio F. Pinilla of Cinemanía rated the film 3½ stars, deeming it to be an "effective [instance of] domestic terror".

Beatriz Martínez of El Periódico de Catalunya rated the film 4 out of 5 stars, assessing that it handles "few elements, but in a very precise and solid way".

See also 
 List of Spanish films of 2023

References 

Spanish supernatural horror films
Films set in 1987
Films shot in the province of Tarragona
2022 horror films
2020s Spanish-language films
2020s Spanish films
Ikiru Films films
Atresmedia Cine films
Films about haunted dolls
2020s supernatural horror films